Kseniia Levkovska, Ukrainian Ксенія Левковська (patronymic: Юріївна), born 13 October 1989 in Kharkiv (Ukrainian: Харків), is a professional Ukrainian triathlete and reserve member of the National Team.

Levkovska earned the title Master of Sports and placed fifth at the Ukrainian (Elite) Championships of the year 2010.
At the Ukrainian Summer Games in Yelistratova's hometown Zhytomir Levkovska placed third (U23) behind Yuliya Yelistratova and Victoria Kachan.
At the Ukrainian Police Championship 2010 Levkovska placed 3rd, at the European Police Championships 2010 in Kitzbühel, however, having the best swimming time, she was disqualified because of a missing running lap.

Levkovska represents the club of her hometown Spartak (Спартак).

In the last three years she has taken part in five ITU competitions and her name is included in the Women Olympic Ranking London 2012.

ITU Competitions
The following list is based upon the official ITU rankings and the Athlete's Profile Page.
Unless indicated otherwise, the following events are triathlons (Olympic Distance) and belong to the Elite category.

References

External links
 Ukrainian Triathlon Federation Федерация триатлона Украины in Russian

1989 births
Living people
Sportspeople from Kharkiv
Ukrainian female triathletes
European Games competitors for Azerbaijan
Triathletes at the 2015 European Games